Don Castle (September 29, 1917 – May 26, 1966) was an American film actor of the 1930s and 1940s.

Biography
Castle was born in Beaumont, Texas. He started his acting career as a stage actor, then moved to films. The actor, who resembled Clark Gable, became close friends with The Guilty co-star Bonita Granville and her husband Jack Wrather, who was a successful businessman and film producer. The relationship eventually led the actor to become a television producer for Wrather's Lassie television program. He maintained a home in Palm Springs, California. After a traffic accident in 1966, Don Castle died of a medication overdose, aged 48.

Partial filmography
 Love Finds Andy Hardy (1938) - Dennis Hunt
 Rich Man, Poor Girl (1938) - Frank
 Young Dr. Kildare (1938) - Dr. Bates (uncredited)
 Men in Fright (1938, Short) - Hospital Orderly (uncredited)
 Out West with the Hardys (1938) - Dennis Hunt
 Fast and Loose (1939) - Desk Clerk (uncredited)
 These Glamour Girls (1939) - Jack
 Thunder Afloat (1939) - Radio Operator (uncredited)
 Nick Carter, Master Detective (1939) - Ed - 1st Hurt Worker (uncredited)
 I Take This Woman (1940) - Ted Fenton
 Northwest Passage (1940) - Richard Towne (uncredited)
 The Ghost Comes Home (1940) - 'Spig'
 Susan and God (1940) - Theater Usher (uncredited)
 We Who Are Young (1940) - Accountex Clerk Making Pass (uncredited)
 Strike Up the Band (1940) - Charlie (uncredited)
 You're the One (1941) - Tony Delmar
 Power Dive (1941) - Doug Farrell
 World Premiere (1941) - Joe Bemis
 Tombstone, the Town Too Tough to Die (1942) - Johnny Duane
 Wake Island (1942) - Pvt. Cunkle (uncredited)
 Star Spangled Rhythm (1942) - Worker - 'Swing Shift' Number (uncredited)
 The Searching Wind (1946) - David
 Lighthouse (1947) - Sam Wells
 Born to Speed (1947) - Mike Conroy
 Seven Were Saved (1947) - Lt. Pete Sturdevant
 The Guilty (1947) - Mike Carr
 High Tide (1947) - Tim 'T.M.' Slade
 The Invisible Wall (1947) - Harry Lane
 Roses Are Red (1947) - Robert A. Thorne / Don Carney
 Perilous Waters (1948) - Willie Hunter
 Madonna of the Desert (1948) - Joe Salinas
 Who Killed Doc Robbin (1948) - George - Defense Attorney
 I Wouldn't Be in Your Shoes (1948) - Thomas J. 'Tom' Quinn
 Strike It Rich (1948) - William 'Tex' Warren
 Stampede (1949) - Tim McCall
 Motor Patrol (1950) - Officer Ken Foster
 The Big Land (1957) - Tom Draper
 Gunfight at the O.K. Corral (1957) - Drunken Cowboy (final film role)

References

1917 births
1966 deaths
20th-century American male actors
Male actors from Texas
Male actors from Palm Springs, California
American male stage actors
American male film actors